Lamprecht is a given name and surname. Notable people with the name include:

Lamprecht, 12th-century German poet
Chris Lamprecht (fl. 1990s), American hacker, first person to be banned from the Internet
Christopher Lamprecht (b. 1985), German football player
Frank Lamprecht (b. 1968), German chess International Master
Günter Lamprecht (1930-2022), German actor
Gerhard Lamprecht (1897–1974), German director
Karl Gotthard Lamprecht (1856–1915), German historian

See also
Lamberg
Lambert (name)
Lambertus
Lampert

Surnames from given names